The 1942 Buffalo Bulls football team was an American football team that represented the University of Buffalo as an independent during the 1942 college football season. In their seventh season under head coach Jim Peele, the Bulls compiled a 6–2 record and outscored opponents by a total of 215 to 52. They played their home games at Civic Stadium in Buffalo, New York.

Buffalo's triple-threat back Lou Corrierre led the team and finished second among eastern college players with 90 points scored.

Schedule

References

Buffalo
Buffalo Bulls football seasons
Buffalo Bulls football